Thomas Hatcher (c. 1589 – 1677) was an English politician who sat in the House of Commons at various times between 1624 and 1659. He fought on the Parliamentary side during the English Civil War.

Hatcher was the son of Sir John Hatcher of Careby, Lincolnshire and his wife Anne Crewes, daughter of James Crewes of Fotheringay, Northamptonshire. He was a student of Emmanuel College, Cambridge in 1603 and of Lincoln's Inn in 1607. He was elected member of parliament (MP) for Lincoln in 1624. In 1628 he was elected MP for Grantham and sat until 1629 when King Charles decided to rule without Parliament for eleven years.
 
In April 1640, Hatcher was elected MP for Stamford in the Short Parliament and was re-elected MP for Stamford for the Long Parliament in November 1640. He was one of the commissioners to Scotland in 1643, and was present at the Battle of Marston Moor and siege of York in 1644. He eventually reached the rank of Colonel. He was one of the members excluded from Parliament in Pride's Purge as being considered too moderate.

In 1654 Hatcher was elected MP for Lincolnshire in the First Protectorate Parliament. He was elected again in 1656 for the Second Protectorate Parliament and in 1659 for the Third Protectorate Parliament.

Hatcher married Katherine Ayscough, daughter of William Ayscough of South Kelsey, Lincolnshire on 14 October 1617. He had a son John and a daughter.

References

 
 

1580s births
1677 deaths
English army officers
Parliamentarian military personnel of the English Civil War
English MPs 1624–1625
English MPs 1628–1629
English MPs 1640 (April)
English MPs 1640–1648
English MPs 1654–1655
English MPs 1656–1658
English MPs 1659
English MPs 1660